Zeta Phi Rho is an American multicultural/Asian interest fraternity based in Southern California. Founded in 1996 at California State University, Long Beach, the fraternity has 7 active chapters in the Southern California region. Zeta Phi Rho is independent and is not affiliated with any national associations.

Mission 
Zeta Phi Rho focuses on developing a diverse group of brothers committed to its philosophy - commitment to character, leadership, academics, and the community. The fraternity is described as having a "strong brotherhood, familial atmosphere, and constantly striv[ing] to maintain its place as a brotherhood of distinguished gentlemen".

Philanthropy 
Fraternity chapters hold various philanthropies in their respective communities including: SmokeOut At The Beach (Alpha chapter, 2007) an effort to raise awareness to the dangers of smoking, "Boot Camp" (Zeta chapter, 2010) a philanthropy dedicated to supporting children diagnosed with HIV, and Zeta Phi "Skid" Rho (Gamma chapter, 2001–Present) providing food for the homeless in the Skid Row area located in downtown Los Angeles.

Zeta Phi "Skid" Rho, organized by USC Gamma chapter, annually results in the participation of well over one hundred students and dozens of student organizations from many Southern California universities. Working with the student volunteers, over five thousand sandwiches are prepared for the homeless in conjunction with the Midnight Mission and Union Rescue Mission. Other events hosted by the chapter include speaker events and fundraisers garnering awareness and funds for the homelessness epidemic in South Central Los Angeles and at large.

By 2000, Zeta Phi Rho had adopted Habitat for Humanity (HfH) as its all-chapter benefit charity. Events hosted to benefit HfH include an All-chapter Halloween Party (2004), Charity Poker Tournament (Beta chapter, 2006), Talent Show (Irvine's Zeta chapter, 2006), and House Warming Party (Epsilon chapter, 2006).

Zeta Phi Rho focuses on raising cultural awareness with the Philip Vera Cruz/Cesar Chavez March (Alpha chapter, 2008) and the "Raise the Roof" Benefit Concert (Alpha chapter, 2008) for Gawad Kalinga, a philanthropic organization aimed at ending the worldwide poverty.
 
A more recent examples of philanthropic efforts by the Fraternity include the "Blu Carpet Affair" film festival, a festival which donates proceeds to the Children of Uganda through Invisible Children (Eta chapter, 2008). Regarded by most as a success, the festival involved with multiple student-organizations across the UCLA campus with each organization creating their own video to be presented in front of an audience and judges.

On , Zeta Phi Rho made 17,341 sandwiches under one hour, breaking a Guinness World Record at the same time.

History 
The 14 founding fathers of Zeta Phi Rho.

Chapters 
Zeta Phi Rho has established ten chapters located in California, seven of which remain active. Active chapter listed in bold, inactive chapters listed with italics.

Notable Alumni 

 Big Matthew - Korean-American rapper, songwriter and composer based in South Korea signed under DSP Media. Known for his membership in the Korean pop group Kard. (Also known for his solo career.)

See also
List of social fraternities and sororities
Asian Americans in California
Fraternity

References 

Fraternities and sororities in the United States
Organizations established in 1995
